Pustomyty Raion was a raion in Lviv Oblast in western Ukraine. Its administrative center was the city of Pustomyty. The raion was abolished on 18 July 2020 as part of the administrative reform of Ukraine, which reduced the number of raions of Lviv Oblast to seven. The area of Pustomyty Raion was merged into Lviv Raion.

It was established in 1959.

At the time of disestablishment, the raion consisted of nine hromadas:
 Davydiv rural hromada with the administration in the selo of Davydiv;
 Murovane rural hromada with the administration in the selo of Murovane;
 Obroshyne rural hromada with the administration in the selo of Obroshyne;
 Pidberiztsi rural hromada with the administration in the selo of Pidberiztsi;
 Pustomyty urban hromada with the administration in Pustomyty;
 Shchyrets settlement hromada with the administration in the urban-type settlement of Shchyrets;
 Sokilnyky rural hromada with the administration in the selo of Sokilnyky;
 Solonka rural hromada with the administration in the selo of Solonka;
 Zymna Voda rural hromada with the administration in the selo of Zymna Voda.

See also
 Administrative divisions of Lviv Oblast

References

External links
 pustomyty.gov.ua 

Former raions of Lviv Oblast
1959 establishments in Ukraine
Ukrainian raions abolished during the 2020 administrative reform